Morris Woodruff Seymour (October 6, 1843 – October 27, 1920) was an American historian, judge, and attorney. He was born in Litchfield, Connecticut. He was a member of the Acorn Club, to which he was elected in 1920. Seymour attended Hopkins Grammar School in New Haven, Connecticut. He was a graduate of Yale College in the class of 1866 and then attended Columbia Law School. He served in the Connecticut State Senate from 1881-1882. He was a son of Origen S. Seymour and brother of Edward Woodruff Seymour.

External links

References 

1843 births
1920 deaths
American Episcopalians
Seymour family (U.S.)
Yale College alumni
American Hispanists
American judges
Connecticut state senators
19th-century American lawyers